Military OneSource is a U.S. Department of Defense program that provides resources and support to active-duty, National Guard and Reserve service members and their families anywhere in the world. The program is available 24 hours a day, 7 days a week at no cost to users.

Services

Military OneSource services include:
 A 24-hour call center staffed with master's-level consultants familiar with the military lifestyle. They answer questions and provide resources and referrals on everyday issues such as finding child care, dealing with stress, helping children deal with a parent's deployment, reunion and reintegration after combat duty, making a PCS move, creating a budget, caring for older relatives, making large-scale consumer purchases, and finding services in the local and military communities.
 Specialized consultations by phone in the areas of special-needs family members, personal finances, and education.  Speciality consultants have focused training in their consultation areas.
 Face-to-face counseling sessions in the user's community designed to address short-term, non-medical needs.  Examples include concerns related to parenting, relationships, stress, deployment, and reunion and reintegration after deployment. Counseling sessions are also available online or by phone
 The Military OneSource website provides information to service members and their families in multiple formats, including audios, articles, checklists, organizers, booklets, DVDs, podcasts, and webinars
 Access to the Military Spouse Career Advancement Accounts (MyCAA) program, which provides financial assistance to military spouses pursuing degrees, licenses, or certification leading to employment in portable career fields
 Personalized health coaching by phone

Military OneSource services supplement existing service-branch and installation resources.  Language-interpretation services are available. Service members and their families can access the program at www.MilitaryOneSource.mil or by calling 1-800-342-9647. International dialing instructions are also listed on the website.

Administration
Military OneSource is administered as a commercial employee assistance program by ValueOptions under contract to the Department of Defense.  ValueOptions took over the contract from Ceridian in 2011.

References

External links

 Military OneSource website
 Press coverage:
 Usatoday.com
 
 Stripes.com
 Kitsapsun.com

United States Department of Defense
United States military support organizations
Military life